The 2021 Derby City Council election took place on 6 May 2021 to elect members of Derby City Council in England. This was on the same day as other local elections. One-third of the seats were up for election, with one ward (Darley) electing two councillors.

Results

Ward results

Abbey

Allestree

Alvaston 

John Evans was the sitting councillor having been elected as a UKIP candidate in 2016.

Arboretum

Blagreaves

Boulton

Chaddesden

Chellaston

Darley

Derwent

Littleover

Mackworth

Mickleover

Normanton

Oakwood

Sinfin

Spondon

References 

Derby City
Derby City Council elections